Anthony Braizat (born 16 August 1977 in Saint-Raphaël, Var) is a French association football coach and former player who most notably played for Toulouse and AS Cannes, before playing for Swiss side Servette FC from 2008 to 2010. He is the current head coach for Swiss Promotion League side Stade Nyonnais.

Coaching career
Braizat formally joined the Servette FC academy staff in June 2010, initially coaching the U13s, supporting the U15s and providing attacking coaching to the U21 side.

It was announced in January 2016 that he was the new head coach of Servette FC.

In March 2017, Braizat took up the role of head coach at Yverdon-Sport.

In January 2020, Braizat was appointed as the head coach of Stade Nyonnais following Ricardo Dionisio's departure from the role. His contract was initially set to run until the end of the 2019-20 season with the possibility of an extension. The season, however, was cancelled following the outbreak of COVID-19 in Switzerland. Nyon proceeded to confirm that Braizat will continue to coach the club when the league restarts.

References

External links
 
 

1977 births
Living people
People from Saint-Raphaël, Var
French footballers
French expatriate footballers
Expatriate footballers in Switzerland
AS Cannes players
Olympique Lyonnais players
Stade Lavallois players
Toulouse FC players
Servette FC players
Ligue 1 players
Association football midfielders
FC Stade Nyonnais managers
Servette FC managers
French football managers
Sportspeople from Var (department)
Footballers from Provence-Alpes-Côte d'Azur